Simon Darcy Clifford is an English football coach, pioneer, and a businessman most commonly known for introducing Brazilian training techniques into the UK with his Brazilian Soccer Schools, being the very first of their kind. Clifford has worked in football for the last 30 years, from youth to senior and non-league to Premier League.

Early Life and Career 
Brought up in Loftus in the North Riding of Yorkshire, he moved to Leeds to study at the age of eighteen. It was there that he started his teaching career in a primary school. He began training the children of the school using techniques derived from Brazilian football. He soon began an after school club that would become the first of a now worldwide chain of soccer schools. In 1997, he borrowed £5000 from a teachers' union to fund a trip to Brazil, where he spoke with Socrates, World Cup winning captain Carlos Alberto, Jairzinho and Rivelino, and watched them coach. Having developed a close friendship with Brazil midfielder Juninho, Clifford used the knowledge he had learned and his own initiative to create a syllabus.

Brazilian Soccer School and SOCATOTS 
Once back in England, Clifford blended his academic knowledge of coaching and his experience as a teacher to develop his own coaching programme. In 1998, he started a Brazilian-style soccer school for youngsters in Leeds, teaching Brazilian skills as well as introducing his students to futebol de salão, unheard of in England at the time. Clifford became the first coach to bring over and popularise futsal in the United Kingdom. This after school club became the first private academy.

Clifford then set out to train his first batch of young footballers with his new methods, with a notably different philosophy, preferring to concentrate on improving ball skills and close control and an even greater emphasis on fitness and physical strength. He went on to expand the "Brazilian Soccer Schools" school franchise to other regions and countries, even expanding overseas to the likes of Hong Kong, Nigeria, South Africa, United States, Australia, the Netherlands, Thailand, Canada, Malaysia, Bermuda, Singapore, Mexico and Poland.

In 2001 Clifford introduced his pre-school coaching programme SOCATOTS, the first such programme in the world to teach basic ball skills, movement and co-ordination exercises to children from as young as six months old. The programme also teaches language, numeracy and colour identification and the children attend with their parents who are an integral part of the classes. This programme, like Clifford's Brazilian Soccer Schools is also a franchise and is running throughout the UK as well as internationally in places such as the Netherlands, Canada, Dubai, Poland and Singapore. It ended up being in over 30 countries.

He lauds Everton coach, Tosh Farrell as "light years ahead of anyone else within the academy system". Tosh said: "Our Under 7, Under 8, Under 9, Under 10 Academy players now use Futebol de Salão in 75% of their training. Our U9’s who have used the ball for two years are one of the strongest age groups in the club".

Clifford sold the Brazilian Soccer Schools franchise in the 2000s, with BSS being on every continent.

Brazilian Soccer Schools is one of the largest football coaching organisation in the world, with over one million children regularly attending sessions around the globe. Players such as Micah Richards and John Bostock are the most successful graduates to date, though there are an estimated 1,700 youngsters working their way through the professional academy ranks. The impact of Brazilian Soccer Schools and the syllabus created by Clifford is still being seen today. A number of emerging young talent in the Premier League have a strong background in futebol de salao, including Charlie Patino of Arsenal F.C., Charlie Webster of Chelsea F.C. and Archie Gray of Leeds United F.C. - all three captaining the England national team at their respective age groups.

Career in Football 
Clifford is well regarded in the football industry; however, he failed to emerge onto the professional scene after being recruited by Sir Clive Woodward in December 2004, to become his assistant coach at Southampton. Woodward had arranged meetings with Clifford before they went into football together to learn from the methods he was using and look at the work he was doing with the soccer schools. After falling out with the coaching establishment at Southampton and leaving his role, he returned to his own non-league club, Garforth Town, as manager.

In 2003 Clifford purchased the Northern Counties East Football League First Division club Garforth Town. At the time of the purchase Clifford expressed the desire to take the club, then at the tenth level of the football pyramid, into the FA Premier League within twenty years. The club has made good progress, gaining two promotions during Clifford's two full seasons as manager. Clifford has managed to attract a number of his high-profile friends to play for the team including: Lee Sharpe, Sócrates and Careca. The club now plays in the Unibond First Division North league.

In April 2009, Clifford guided his team to the final of the West Riding County Cup to face Bradford Park Avenue. Heavy underdogs Garforth won 5–4 on penalties to claim the cup, a trophy which has been held by Leeds United among others. After three seasons of managing Garforth Town, Clifford made the decision to step aside as manager of his club. This was to focus and develop more quickly his SOCATOTS and Brazilian Soccer Schools programmes.

Over the last 12 years, Clifford has worked with Michael Owen, Wayne Rooney and Theo Walcott among others, and following his departure from Southampton, Cardiff City approached him with a view to appointing him in a similar role at Ninian Park.

Many players have been fans of Clifford's work and methods, including Jay Jay Okocha, Michael Owen and the legendary Brazilian footballer and coach, Zico.

In September 2008, Clifford was approached by a South African consortium looking to purchase Newcastle United Football Club, with the party offering the 38-year-old a role as Academy Director as well as shares in the club. In the same month, he was also approached by Tottenham Hotspur midfielder David Bentley, with the England international asking Clifford to devise an elite training programme and to undertake one-to-one sessions with him. Work commitments, however, saw Clifford turn down the opportunity.

Notable Graduates 
The following noted players have all graduated from Simon Clifford's BSS system:

 Micah Richards, Manchester City, England
 John Farnworth, World Champion football freestyler

Work in TV, Film and Media 
Clifford worked as Technical Coach for the two lead actresses of Bend It Like Beckham, Keira Knightley and Parminder Nagra. Clifford also performed the same role in the film There's Only One Jimmy Grimble with Robert Carlyle and Ray Winstone as well as the more recent Kicking and Screaming. He choreographed and advised on the film The Damned United.

In November 2008, Clifford was approached by Setanta Sports with a view to him doing a regular blog for the company's website. His first, a critique of the state of the game from grassroots level up, was particularly damning of Tottenham Hotspur manager Harry Redknapp, while subsequent articles have highlighted problems within the game.

Other Work 
In May 2011, Clifford was made an official Yorkshire Patron for his work promoting the region around the world.

References

External links 
Brazilian Soccer Schools
Simon Clifford@Garforth Town AFC
SOCATOTS concept

English football managers
1970 births
Living people
Sportspeople from Middlesbrough
Alumni of Leeds Beckett University
People from Loftus, North Yorkshire
Southampton F.C. non-playing staff
Garforth Town A.F.C. managers
People from Halton Moor